The 1963 Calgary Stampeders finished in 2nd place in the Western Conference with a 10–4–2 record. They were defeated in the Western Semi-Finals by the Saskatchewan Roughriders.

Regular season

Season standings

Season schedule

Playoffs

Cenference Semi-Finals

 Saskatchewan won the total-point series by 48–47. The Roughriders will play the BC Lions in the Western Finals.

Awards and records

1963 CFL All-Stars

References

Calgary Stampeders seasons
Calgary Stampeders
1963 Canadian Football League season by team